Colegio San José Maristas del Callao is a private Catholic primary and secondary school, located in Callao, in the Lima metropolitan area of Peru. The school is run by the Marist Brothers who began teaching in the area in 1909. In 2018 the secondary had 10 sections with 307 students.

See also 

 Education in Peru
 List of Marist Brothers schools

References  

Marist Brothers schools
Catholic primary schools in Peru
Educational institutions established in 1909
1909 establishments in Peru
Catholic secondary schools in Peru